Khalsa College ( khālsā kālaj) is a historic educational institution in the northern Indian city of Amritsar in the state of Punjab, India. Founded in 1892, the sprawling  campus is located about eight kilometers from the city-center on the Amritsar-Lahore highway (part of the Grand Trunk Road), adjoining Guru Nanak Dev University campus, to which Khalsa College is academically affiliated.

Khalsa College was built as an educational institute during the British Raj in India when Sikh scholars thought about providing higher education to Sikhs and Punjabis within Punjab. Amritsar was chosen for its establishment and Singh Sabha Movement and Chief Khalsa Diwan approached the then Sikh Maharajas and Sikh people of Punjab to raise funds and donate land to build this unique institute. People of Amritsar, Lahore and other cities of Punjab including rich Sikh families and Maharajas donated land and raised funds to build Khalsa College, Amritsar. Its architectural design was created by Ram Singh, a famous architect who also designed one of the Places in England. Its building was completed in 1911–12. Its architectural features are mix of British, Mughal and Sikh architect.

Khalsa college's contribution towards the freedom history of India is significant as it has generated many famous freedom fighters, political leaders, armed forces generals, scientists, famous players-Olympians, actors, writers, journalists and scholars. More information about Khalsa college can be found in the book "History of Khalsa College Amritsar," written by Dr. Ganda Singh, former head of the dept. of Sikh History, Khalsa College Amritsar. In modern times, the only research work on Khalsa College's history, "The Temple of Study-Khalsa College Amritsar," was initiated by Jaspreet Singh Rajpoot, an alumnus of Khalsa, in the year 2002 with the collaboration of Khalsa College governing council and Dr. Mohinder Singh Dhillon (the then Principal of KCA), reveals the facts of Khalsa college which are still unknown to most of the people around the world.

History

Khalsa College Establishment Committee was set up in 1890 with Colonel W. R. M. Holroyd, Director of Public Instruction, Punjab, as president, and W. Bell, Principal of Government College, Lahore, as secretary. Among the native constituents of this 121-member committee were Sir Attar Singh, Gurdial Singh Maan of Nabha, Diwan Gurmukh Singh of Patiala, Bhai Kahn Singh, Professor Gurmukh Singh and Sardar Jawahir Singh (1859–1910). Many princely states of British India and Sikh people of Punjab gave their financial help to the establishment of Khalsa College, including Maharaja Rajendra Singh of Patiala, Maharaja Hira Singh of Nabha, Maharaja Jagatjit Singh of Kapurthala and Sir Sunder Singh Majithia.

After a prolonged discussion about the site of Khalsa College, it was decided that one college would be established in Amritsar, followed by a second in Lahore. The  campus was sited just outside the village of Kot Sayyad Mehmood, which was later renamed Kot Khalsa.

Campus

The main building is of the Indo-Sarcenic style, which is strongly influenced by traditional Indian and Mughal schools of architecture. The foundation stone was laid on 5 March 1892, with the first classes starting in 1893.

The college was designed by Bhai Ram Singh, principal of the Mayo School of Arts, Lahore, with the help of engineer Dharam Singh Gharjakhia. Bhai Ram Singh was decorated for his services with the Member of the Victorian Order (MVO), the highest civilian award of British India.

Faculties 
Khalsa College has following faculties:
Faculty of Humanities and Social Sciences
Faculty of Commerce and Business Administration
Faculty of Sciences
College of Agriculture
Institute of Computer Science

Institutes
The institutions under Khalsa College Charitable Society, which is running the century-old Khalsa College:

Colleges-
 Khalsa College, Amritsar-India (established.1892)
 Khalsa College of Education, Amritsar (established.1954)
 Khalsa College for Women, Amritsar (established.1968)
 Khalsa College of Education, Ranjit Avenue, Amritsar (established.2006)
 Khalsa College of Nursing, Amritsar (established.2006)
 Khalsa College of Pharmacy, Amritsar (established.2009)
 Khalsa College of Engineering & Tech., Ranjit Avenue, Amritsar (established.2009)
 Khalsa College of Veterinary and Animal Sciences, Amritsar (established.2009)
 Khalsa College (Amritsar) of  Technology & Business Studies, Mohali (established.2009)
 Khalsa College of Physical Education, VPO Heir, District. Amritsar (established.2009)
 Khalsa College Chawinda Devi, Amritsar
 Khalsa College of Law, Amritsar
 Khalsa College of Management & Technology, Amritsar
 
Schools-
 Khalsa College Sr. Sec. School (Boys), Amritsar (established. 1892)
 Khalsa College Sr. Sec. School (Girls), Amritsar (established. 1942)
 Khalsa College Public School, Amritsar Amritsar (established. 1984)
 Khalsa College International Public School, Ranjit Avenue, Amritsar (established. 2001)
 Khalsa College Public School, Heir, Amritsar (established. 2008)

Notable alumni

Rajkavi Inderjeet Singh Tulsi, Poet, Author, and Bollywood Lyricist
Hans Raj Khanna, former Judge of Supreme Court of India who authored the basic structure doctrine
Harcharan Singh, Punjabi playwright
Harpreet Sandhu (actor), actor
Gurbachan Singh Randhawa, athlete
Pratap Singh Kairon, former Chief Minister of Punjab
 Darbara Singh, former Chief Minister of Punjab and national level leader of the Congress
 Teja Singh Samundri (1882–1926), founder of SGPC - Shiromani Gurudwara Prabhandhak Committee
 Rajinder Singh "Sparrow" Shergill
 Sohan Singh Josh (1898-–1970?), socialist leader of Punjab
 Gurdial Singh Dhillon, former Speaker of the Indian Parliament
 Hukam Singh, former Speaker of the Indian Parliament
 Mulk Raj Anand, novelist
 Kidar Sharma, film director and screenwriter
 Bhisham Sahni, filmmaker and writer
 Manohar Singh Gill, former Chief Election Commissioner of India
 Maninder Singh, Captain of the Pro Kabaddi League franchise Bengal Warriors
 Hardeep Tauo Toganwalia, Captain of Canadian Kabaddi Team
 Bishen Singh Bedi, former captain of the Indian cricket team
 Gurshabad, Playback singer, actor, and performer
 Ranjit Bawa, Punjabi singer
 Amrinder Gill, actor and singer 
 Karaj Gill, film producer
 Khem Singh Gill, geneticist and former vice chancellor of Punjab Agricultural University
Hockey players
 Balbir Singh Sr.
 Dharam Singh
 Harbinder Singh

References

External links
 Khalsa College Amritsar website

Monuments and memorials in Punjab, India
Khalsa College, Amritsar
Education in Amritsar
Palaces in Punjab, India
Indo-Saracenic Revival architecture